Eperara  Epena (Southern Embera) is an Embera language of Colombia, with about 250 speakers in Ecuador.

Geographic Distribution 
Epena is spoken on the Pacific coastal rivers of the departments of Nariño, Cauca, and Valle del Cauca in Colombia. A major grouping of the Epena is found in Cauca along the Saija River and three of its major tributaries: the Guangüí, Infí, and Cupí. Social contact and intermarriage with the neighboring Wounaan is commonplace.

The Basuradó dialect is spoken on the Basuradó River in the Department of the Chocó, near the Docampadó River. This is the only Epena dialect that differs significantly from the others.

Orthography
 a - [a]
 ã - [ã]
 b - [b]
 ch - [t͡ʃ]
 d - [d]
 e - [e]
 ẽ - [ẽ]
 ë - [ə]
 ë̃ - [ə̃]
 g - [g]
 i - [i]
 ĩ - [ĩ]
 ï - [ɨ] (also written as ɨ in some texts)
 ï̃ - [ɨ̃]
 j - [h]
 k - [k]
 k' - [kʰ]
 m - [m]
 n - [n]
 o - [o]
 õ - [õ]
 p - [p]
 p' - [pʰ]
 r - [ɾ~r]
 s - [s]
 t - [t]
 t' - [tʰ]
 u - [u]
 ũ - [ũ]
 w - [w]
 y - [j]

Glottal stops are represented with hyphens.

Long vowels are doubled.

C, f, h, l, ñ, q, v, x, z are used in foreign words and names.

Phonology

Consonants

Vowels

Notes

Bibliography
Harms, Phillip Lee. 1994. Epena Pedee Syntax. Dallas: Summer Institute of Linguistics and University of Texas at Arlington.

External links
Epena (Intercontinental Dictionary Series)

Languages of Colombia
Choco languages